Events from the year 1614 in Quebec.

Events
Both the Compagnie des Marchands de Rouen et de Saint-Malo and the Compagnie de Champlain are founded by Samuel de Champlain, Lieutenant General of New France, and merchants of Rouen and Saint Malo

Births

Deaths

References

1610s in Canada
Quebec, 1614 In
Years in Quebec